The Covered Trail is a 1924 American silent Western film directed by Jack Nelson and starring J.B. Warner, Robert McKenzie and Ruth Dwyer.

Cast
 J.B. Warner as Bill Keats
 Robert McKenzie as Sheriff
 Ruth Dwyer
 Milburn Morante

References

External links
 

1924 films
1924 Western (genre) films
American black-and-white films
Films directed by Jack Nelson
Silent American Western (genre) films
1920s English-language films
1920s American films